Tribal Heart is a compilation album of music from the South Pacific. It was coordinated by Denis Gonzalez and released in Australia by AIM Records in 1994. It was nominated for a 1995 ARIA Award for Best World Music Album.

Accolades

Track listing

 Buffalo Stampede - Blek Bala Mujik 
 Tahi (Kia Kotahi Ra) - Moana and the Moahunters
 Saturday Night - Fontom From
 Keep an Open Heart - Willie Hona
 Black Australia - I Land
 Congo Bongo - Joe T (i.e. Richmond Acheampong) 
 Uyu Teo - Larry Maluma and Kalimba
 Mununutapa - Valanga Khoza and Saffika
 French Letter - Herbs
 My Mother, My Land - Ron Jemmott and Un Tabu 
 Somalia - Shango
 I Man Never Die - Denis Gonzalez 
 Just Another Weekend - Dee Cee Lewis and The Crew
 Rowena - Barike 
 Musiki Manjaro - Musiki Manjaro
 Mawo Ma - Kakalika

References

Compilation albums by Australian artists